Boylston Market (1810-1887), designed by architect Charles Bulfinch, was located in Boston, Massachusetts, on the corner of Boylston and Washington Streets. Boylston Hall occupied the third floor of the building, and functioned as a performance and meeting space.

History
The Boylston Market Association developed the building. John Quincy Adams served as the association's first president. In 1809, the proprietors paid $20,560 for the land formerly belonging to Joseph C. Dyer (and to Samuel Welles before him). The new building "was named to honor the benevolent and philanthropic Ward Nicholas Boylston"

Architecture
Construction began in April, 1810, and was completed the same year. The 3-story building measured 120 feet long and 50 feet wide. "On the first floor are 12 stalls for the sale of provisions. The 2nd is separated by an avenue running lengthwise, on the sides of which are 4 spacious rooms. The 3rd story consists of a hall 100 feet in length with the entire width of the building. the central height of the ceiling is 24 feet. It contains an orchestra, and 2 convenient withdrawing-rooms adjoining."

"In 1859 an extension of 40 feet was made."  "In 1870 the solid brick structure was moved back from the street eleven feet without disturbing the occupants."

Tenants
Early tenants included the Linnaean Society of New England, and Edward Savage's New York Museum, c. 1812, both "handsomely fitted with natural and artificial curiosities." The Handel and Haydn Society held concerts in the hall for several years. In 1845 some of the members of the Workingmen's Protective Union opened a shop on the 2nd floor. Other vendors in the market included butter & cheese dealers M.C. Strout and F.H. Thomas (c. 1877).

Special events in Boylston Hall included the New-England Anti-Slavery Convention, 1834; July 4 celebrations of the New England Anti-Slavery Society in the 1830s; and Corydon Donnavan's "Grand Serial Panorama of Mexico," c. 1848: "Capt. Donnavan, for several months a prisoner during the recent war in [Mexico], will deliver an explanatory discourse, relating many incidents of the war, Mexican life, manners, &c, as the painting passes before the audience."

Demolition
Boylston Market was demolished in 1887. In its place, the "Boylston Building" was erected.  The belfry from the original Boylston Market structure went to the Calvary Methodist Church in Arlington, Massachusetts, in 1921.

In popular culture
Poet John Pierpont refers to the Boylston Market in his 1840 poem "The Drunkard's Funeral."

Images

References

Further reading

 Paul Dean. A eulogy delivered in Boylston Hall, Boston at the request of the Masonic, Handel and Haydn, and Philharmonic Societies, August 19, 1819, on the character of their late friend and brother Thomas Smith Webb, Esq.

Former buildings and structures in Boston
Commercial buildings completed in 1810
19th century in Boston
Boston Theater District
Chinatown, Boston
Charles Bulfinch buildings